Peer Jand is a village in the Gujrat District of Kharian Tehsil, Punjab Province, Pakistan. The union council is Juara and it is situated on the Lalamusa - Sargodha railway line and Lalamusa Dinga Road, 16 km west of Lalamusa. The population is approximately 3,500, and it consists of people from the Gurjar caste. Haji Ansar Chachi is General Councillor of the village.

References 

Populated places in Gujrat District